Weidu is a district of the city of Xuchang, Henan province, China, named for Xuchang having been the capital of the Cao Wei state furing the Three Kingdom era.

Administrative divisions
As of 2012, this county is divided to 12 subdistricts.
Subdistricts

References

County-level divisions of Henan
Xuchang